Oyrareingir is a village on the Faroese island Streymoy in  Tórshavn Municipality.

It is situated at the very head of the Kollafjørður-fjord, on either side of the mouth of the Dalá river. The 2020 population was 45. Its postal code is FO 415. This hamlet is so tiny and its few houses so dispersed among the 'outskirts' of the neighbouring villages of Signabøur and Kollafjørður that few maps mention it. Even the Faroe Islands' best online atlas doesn't. The Faroe Islands' main road (No. 10) from Tórshavn to Klaksvík passes right through Oyrareingir. The only other road -a small one leading to some farms- is called á Oyrareingjum.

In 2020 the population had 20 Males and 25 Females. The age group of the village was 12 people within the age range of 0–17, 25 people were in the age group of 18–64, and 7 people were 65 or over.

Below is a chart showing the population over time:

See also
 List of towns in the Faroe Islands

References

External links
 Danish site with photographs of Oyrareingir
 Oyrareingir on Google maps

Populated places in the Faroe Islands